Insight is an American religious-themed weekly anthology series that aired in syndication from October 1960 to 1983. Insight holds a unique place in the history of public service television programming. Produced by Paulist Productions in Los Angeles, it was an anthology series, using an eclectic set of storytelling forms including comedy, melodrama, and fantasy to explore moral dilemmas.

The series was created by Catholic priest Ellwood E. "Bud" Kieser, the founder of Paulist Productions. A member of the Paulist Fathers, an evangelistic Catholic order of priests, he worked in the entertainment community in Hollywood as a priest-producer and occasional host, using television as a vehicle of spiritual enrichment.  Many of the episodes of the series were videotaped at Television City Studios and then Metromedia Square.

It was the longest-running syndicated weekly show until Soul Train took over in 1996, and ran until 2008 (only Entertainment Tonight, Wheel Of Fortune,  Jeopardy! & Extra are longer). It is also the longest-running religious drama program ever.

Overview

Early episodes were produced at CBS Television City. They were largely videos of Kieser speaking, similar to Fulton J. Sheen's East Coast program. By the second season Kieser switched to dramatizing stories; the approach was more humanist, than strictly Catholic. Actor Patrick McGeehan narrated several episodes. Actress Lola Lane sold the Paulists a property on Pacific Coast Highway that had previously belonged to her late husband, director Roland West.

Typically shown on Sunday mornings or late night, the program aired nationally for well over two decades. Often stations aired Insight in order to meet the Federal Communications Commission's public interest standard for broadcast television. In its heyday Insight was played in syndication on over 195 stations. Occasionally it was even broadcast at prime-time in major markets as "holiday specials".

Contributing artists
The anthology format and the religious nature of the program attracted a wide variety of 
actors, directors and writers to work on the series, drawn by the show’s reputation for consistently stretching the creative boundaries of television. In many cases they donated their talents and time.

Actors

 Jack Albertson
 Elizabeth Ashley
 Ed Asner (4 episodes )
 John Astin
 Diane Baker
 Billy Barty
 Ed Begley
 Ed Begley, Jr.
 Carl Betz
 Bill Bixby
 Tom Bosley
 Beau Bridges
 Albert Brooks
 Gary Burghoff
 Carol Burnett
 Terry Burnham
 Michael Burns (six episodes)
 Joseph Campanella
 Elisha Cook Jr.
 Robert Culp
 Ann B. Davis
 Laura Dern
 Melinda Dillon (four episodes)
 Ivan Dixon
 James Doohan   
 Patty Duke
 Irene Dunne
 Wesley Eure
 Marty Feldman
 Norman Fell
 Peter Fonda
 John Forsythe
 Anne Francis
 Vincent Gardenia
 Beverly Garland
 Frank Gorshin
 Louis Gossett Jr.
 Harold Gould
 Mark Hamill
 Barbara Hale
 Jonathan Harris
 Bob Hastings 
 Celeste Holm 
 Ron Howard
 Jeffrey Hunter 
 Ann Jillian
 Brian Keith
 Ricky Kelman 
 Jack Klugman
 Steve Landesberg
 Robert Lansing 
 Michael Learned
 Harvey Lembeck
 Michael Lembeck
 June Lockhart
 Randolph Mantooth
 William Marshall
 Nan Martin
 Raymond Massey
 Walter Matthau
 Tim Matheson
 Maureen McCormick
 Vera Miles
 Roger Mobley
 Ricardo Montalbán
 Juanita Moore
 Greg Morris
 Bill Mumy
 Bob Newhart
 Nichelle Nichols
 Carroll O'Connor
 Alan Oppenheimer
 Eve Plumb
 Allan Rich
 John Ritter
 Marion Ross
 Maggie Roswell
 William Shatner
 Michael Shea
 Martin Sheen
 Henry Silva
 Ann Sothern
 James Stacy
 Guy Stockwell 
 Barry Sullivan
 Meg Tilly
 Cicely Tyson
 Dick Van Patten 
 Cindy Williams
 Flip Wilson
 William Windom
 Deborah Winters
 Jane Wyman
 Keenan Wynn
 Dick York
 Efrem Zimbalist, Jr.
 Kate Klugman

Directors

 Lew V. Adams
 Richard C. Bennett
 Richard Beymer
 Robert Butler
 Hal Cooper
 Marc Daniels
 Linda Day
 Mel Ferber 
 Arthur Hiller
 Lamont Johnson
 Buzz Kulik 
 Norman Lloyd
 J.D. Lobue
 John Meredyth Lucas
 Delbert Mann
 John Newland
 Daniel Petrie 
 Ted Post
 Michael Ray Rhodes
 Seymour Robbie 
 Jay Sandrich, 
 Ralph Senesky 
 Jack Shea
 Paul Stanley

Writers 

 Bernard Abbene
 Michael Crichton 
 John T. Dugan 
 Harry Julian Fink
 Jack Hanrahan
 Fr. Ellwood Kieser CSP
 John Meredyth Lucas
 Lan O'Kun
 William P. McGivern
 John McGreevey
 James E. Moser
 Gilbert Ralston
 Michael Ray Rhodes 
 Rod Serling
 Terrance Sweeney
 E. Sarsfield Waters
 Stanford Whitmore
 John Rester Zodrow

Awards and nominations
Offbeat and experimental by design, the series won numerous Emmy Awards and received critical praise for addressing social issues. Insight was nominated for the Emmy for Outstanding Achievement in Religious Programming in 1972 and 1973, and won the category every year from 1981 to 1984.

In 2003, UCLA Film and Television Archive became custodian of Paulist Productions’ physical inventory of Insight videos and films. "'Insight' represents something that doesn’t exist anymore: faith-based, scripted, quality TV programming, delivered free to television stations for broadcast,” said Father Frank Desiderio, Kieser's successor at Paulist Productions. Episodes are available for purchase from the Paulist Press.

References

External links
 
 
 "William Shatner wrestles with his soul at 4 AM, and this priest has it on videotape" (''Chicago Reader, November 6, 2014)
 Insight on youtube

1960 American television series debuts
1985 American television series endings
1960s American drama television series
1970s American drama television series
1980s American drama television series
1960s American anthology television series
Christian entertainment television series
Black-and-white American television shows
English-language television shows
First-run syndicated television programs in the United States
Television shows about Catholicism
1970s American anthology television series
1980s American anthology television series

es:Insight